James Albert "Jim" Lewis, Jr. (December 26, 1930 – June 9, 2016) was a Democratic member of the Indiana Senate, representing the 45th District from 1986 until 2010. He earlier served from 1974 through 1978. Previously he was a member of the Indiana House of Representatives from 1970 through 1972. Lewis also served on the Charlestown City Council for eight years and on the Clark County, Indiana council for two years. He died in 2016.

References

External links
 

1930 births
2016 deaths
County commissioners in Indiana
Indiana city council members
Democratic Party members of the Indiana House of Representatives
Democratic Party Indiana state senators
People from Charlestown, Indiana
People from Lincoln County, Kentucky
Businesspeople from Indiana
20th-century American businesspeople